Anna Heer was a Swiss physician. She played a major role in the founding of Switzerland's first professional nursing school.

She was one the founders of the first women’s hospital in Zurich. In 1897 she became the chief physician at the hospital.

She was the head of the SUPFS since 1901 as well as the head of pflegerinnenschule of Zurich. She died on 9 December 1918 in Zurich from sepsis.

References

Swiss physicians
Women physicians
1863 births
1918 deaths
Swiss gynaecologists
University of Zurich alumni
People from Olten